Dil Tera Deewana is a 1962 Hindi-language comedy film. The film was directed by B.R.Panthulu, and written by Inder Raj Anand and Raj Baldev Raj.

It stars Shammi Kapoor, Mala Sinha, Mehmood, Pran and Om Prakash. The music is by Shankar Jaikishan. The film is black and white in an era where colour films had already started making their appearance. The music of the film was popular. The film was a remake of the Tamil film Sabaash Meena.

Cast
 Shammi Kapoor as Mohan Badriprasad 
 Mala Sinha as Meena 
 Mehmood as Anokhe / Mohan
 Pran as Ganpat 
 Om Prakash as Captain Dayaram 
 Mumtaz Begum as Mohan's mom 
 Manmohan Krishna as Meena's dad
 Ulhas as Diwan Badriprasad, Mohan’s father
 Shubha Khote as Malti
 Mohan Choti as Raja
 Kammo

Plot
Wayward, brash, and disobedient Mohan (Shammi Kapoor) is sent by his angry dad Diwan Badriprasad (Ulhas) to a retired army captain Dayaram (Om Prakash) to learn some discipline and respect. But Mohan asks his friend Anokhe (Mehmood) to switch places with him, and Anokhe agrees to do so. Mohan meets with Meena (Mala Sinha), who lives with her blind dad (Manmohan Krishan). Anokhe is welcomed as Mohan by Captain Dayaram and his daughter Malti (Shubha Khote) in their household. Eventually, both Malti and Anokhe fall in love. Things start to get even more muddled when Captain Dayaram finds out that Anokhe is married to another woman, and that Anokhe drives a rickshaw. The police are notified and they are asked to arrest Mohan - they arrest 3 Mohans. Who is the real Mohan?

Soundtrack

Awards
Filmfare Best Supporting Actor Award for Mehmood

References

External links
 

1960s Hindi-language films
Films scored by Shankar–Jaikishan
1962 films
Hindi remakes of Tamil films
Films directed by B. R. Panthulu

1962 comedy films
Indian comedy films